This article is an overview of representation of women in Malaysia's state legislative assemblies.

Johor 
There have been 34 women in the Johor State Legislative Assembly since its establishment in 1959. In the 14th Johor State Legislative Assembly, there are 15 women in the 56 member Legislative Assembly.

Women have had the right to vote and the right to stand as candidates since 1959. The first successful female candidate for the Legislative Assembly was Fatimah Abdul Majid, who was elected as the member for Plentong in 1959. Since then there have continuously been female members in the Assembly.

This is an incomplete list of women who have served as members of the Johor State Legislative Assembly, ordered by seniority. This list includes women who served in the past and who continue to serve in the present.

Proportion

Kedah 
There have been 16 women in the Kedah State Legislative Assembly since its establishment in 1959. In the 14th Kedah State Legislative Assembly, there are 5 women in the 36 member Legislative Assembly.

Women have had the right to vote and the right to stand as candidates since 1959. The first successful female candidate for the Legislative Assembly was Hamidah Omar, who was elected as the member for Sik-Gurun in 1959. Since then there have continuously been female members in the Assembly.

This is an incomplete list of women who have served as members of the Kedah State Legislative Assembly, ordered by seniority. This list includes women who served in the past and who continue to serve in the present.

Proportion

Kelantan 
There have been 7 women in the Kelantan State Legislative Assembly since its establishment in 1959. In the 14th Kelantan State Legislative Assembly, there are 2 women in the 45 member Legislative Assembly.

Women have had the right to vote and the right to stand as candidates since 1959. The first successful female candidate for the Legislative Assembly was Tengku Noor Asiah Tengku Ahmad, who was elected as the member for Sungei Pinang in 1982. Since then there have continuously been female members in the Assembly.

This is an incomplete list of women who have served as members of the Kelantan State Legislative Assembly, ordered by seniority. This list includes women who served in the past and who continue to serve in the present.

Proportion

Malacca 
There have been 13 women in the Malacca State Legislative Assembly since its establishment in 1959. In the 15th Malacca State Legislative Assembly, there are 5 women in the 28 member Legislative Assembly.

Women have had the right to vote and the right to stand as candidates since 1959. The first successful female candidate for the Legislative Assembly was Fatimah Ahmad, who was elected as the member for Bukit Rambai in 1974. Since then there have continuously been female members in the Assembly.

This is an incomplete list of women who have served as members of the Malacca State Legislative Assembly, ordered by seniority. This list includes women who served in the past and who continue to serve in the present.

Proportion

Negeri Sembilan 

There have been 13 women in the Negeri Sembilan State Legislative Assembly since its establishment in 1959. In the 14th Negeri Sembilan State Legislative Assembly, there are 2 women in the 36 member Legislative Assembly.

Women have had the right to vote and the right to stand as candidates since 1959. The first successful female candidate for the Legislative Assembly was Siti Rahmah Kassim, who was elected as the member for Terentang in 1959. Since then there have continuously been female members in the Assembly.

This is an incomplete list of women who have served as members of the Negeri Sembilan State Legislative Assembly, ordered by seniority. This list includes women who served in the past and who continue to serve in the present.

Proportion

Pahang 
There have been 15 women in the Pahang State Legislative Assembly since its establishment in 1959. In the 14th Pahang State Legislative Assembly, there are 2 women in the 42 member Legislative Assembly.

Women have had the right to vote and the right to stand as candidates since 1959. The first successful female candidate for the Legislative Assembly was Mahimon Harun, who was elected as the member for Telok Sisek in 1959. Since then there have continuously been female members in the Assembly.

This is an incomplete list of women who have served as members of the Pahang State Legislative Assembly, ordered by seniority. This list includes women who served in the past and who continue to serve in the present.

Proportion

Penang 
There have been 16 women in the Penang State Legislative Assembly since its establishment in 1959. In the 14th Penang State Legislative Assembly, there are 6 women in the 40 member Legislative Assembly.

Women have had the right to vote and the right to stand as candidates since 1959. The first successful female candidates for the Legislative Assembly were Ragayah Ariff and Kee Phaik Cheen, who were elected as the member for Sungai Acheh and Batu Uban respectively in 1986. Since then there have continuously been female members in the Assembly.

This is an incomplete list of women who have served as members of the Penang State Legislative Assembly, ordered by seniority. This list includes women who served in the past and who continue to serve in the present.

Proportion

Perak 
There have been 31 women in the Perak State Legislative Assembly since its establishment in 1959. In the 15th Perak State Legislative Assembly, there are 12 women in the 59 member Legislative Assembly.

Women have had the right to vote and the right to stand as candidates since 1959. The first successful female candidates for the Legislative Assembly were Halimah Abdul Raof and Som Abdullah, who were elected as the member for Parit Buntar and Batak Rabit respectively in 1959. Since then there have continuously been female members in the Assembly.

This is an incomplete list of women who have served as members of the Perak State Legislative Assembly, ordered by seniority. This list includes women who served in the past and who continue to serve in the present.

Proportion

Perlis

There have been 11 women in the Perlis State Legislative Assembly since its establishment in 1959. In the 15th Perlis State Legislative Assembly, there are 3 women in the 15 member Legislative Assembly.

Women have had the right to vote and the right to stand as candidates since 1959. The first successful female candidate for the Legislative Assembly was Ramlah @ Che Ah Long, who was elected as the member for Kayang in 1990. Since then there have continuously been female members in the Assembly.

This is an incomplete list of women who have served as members of the Perlis State Legislative Assembly, ordered by seniority. This list includes women who served in the past and who continue to serve in the present.

Proportion

Timeline

Sarawak 
There have been 15 women in the Sarawak State Legislative Assembly since its establishment in 1867. In the 19th Sarawak State Legislative Assembly, there are 5 women in the 82 member Legislative Assembly.

Women have had the right to vote and the right to stand as candidates since 1969. The first successful female candidate for the Legislative Assembly was Ajibah Abol, who was elected as the member for Semariang in 1971. Since then there have continuously been female members in the Assembly.

This is an incomplete list of women who have served as members of the Sarawak State Legislative Assembly, ordered by seniority. This list includes women who served in the past and who continue to serve in the present.

Proportion

Sabah 
There have been 15 women in the Sabah State Legislative Assembly since its establishment in 1963. In the 15th Sabah State Legislative Assembly, there are 7 women in the 60 member Legislative Assembly.

Women have had the right to vote and the right to stand as candidates since 1967. The first successful female candidate for the Legislative Assembly was Rahimah Stephens, who was elected as the member for Kiulu in 1976. Since then there have continuously been female members in the Assembly.

This is an incomplete list of women who have served as members of the Sabah State Legislative Assembly, ordered by seniority. This list includes women who served in the past and who continue to serve in the present.

Proportion

Selangor 
There have been 36 women in the Selangor State Legislative Assembly since its establishment in 1959. In the 14th Selangor State Legislative Assembly, there are 13 women in the 56 member Legislative Assembly.

Women have had the right to vote and the right to stand as candidates since 1959. The first successful female candidates for the Legislative Assembly were Ganga Nayar and Salmah Mohd Salleh, who were elected as the member for Serendah and Semenyih respectively in 1971. Since then there have continuously been female members in the Assembly.

This is an incomplete list of women who have served as members of the Selangor State Legislative Assembly, ordered by seniority. This list includes women who served in the past and who continue to serve in the present.

Proportion

Terengganu 
There has been 1 woman in the Terengganu State Legislative Assembly since its establishment in 1959. In the 14th Terengganu State Legislative Assembly, there are no women in the 32 member Legislative Assembly but there one women was nominated directly not by election as member in 2018.

Women have had the right to vote and the right to stand as candidates since 1959. The first successful female candidate for the Legislative Assembly was Teh Hassan, who was elected as the member for Chukai in 1971.

This is an incomplete list of women who have served as members of the Terengganu State Legislative Assembly, ordered by seniority. This list includes women who served in the past and who continue to serve in the present.

Proportion

References

Who's who in Malaysia and guide to Singapore. (1978). Kuala Lumpur.
Abdullah, Z. G., Adnan, H. N., & Lee, K. H. (1997). Malaysia, tokoh dulu dan kini = Malaysian personalities, past and present. Kuala Lumpur, Malaysia: Penerbit Universiti Malaya.
Andrighetti, V., Sunai, P., Asian Network for Free Elections., & Asian Forum for Human Rights and Development. (2000). Malaysia: Report of the 1999 Election Observation Mission, 25 November-1 December. Bangkok, Thailand: Asian Network for Free Elections.
Anzagain Sdn. Bhd. (2004). Almanak keputusan pilihan raya umum: Parlimen & Dewan Undangan Negeri, 1959-1999. Shah Alam, Selangor: Anzagain.
Chin, U.-H. (1996). Chinese politics in Sarawak: A study of the Sarawak United People's Party. Kuala Lumpur: Oxford University Press.
Crouch, H. (1982). Malaysia's 1982 General Election. Institute of Southeast Asian Studies.
Dewan Bahasa dan Pustaka. (1982). Dewan masyarakat, Volume 20. Selangor Darul Ehsan, etc.: Media Network Sdn. Bhd., etc..
Faisal, S. H. (2012). Domination and Contestation: Muslim Bumiputera Politics in Sarawak. Institute of Southeast Asian Studies.
Gomez, E. T. (1996). The 1995 Malaysian general elections: A report and commentary. Singapore: Institute of Southeast Asian Studies.
Hanna, W. A. (1959). Elections in Malaya: A report. New York: American Universities Field Staff.
Hussain, M. (1987). Membangun demokrasi: Pilihanraya di Malaysia. Kuala Lumpur: Karya Bistari.
Ibnu, H. (1993). PAS kuasai Malaysia?: 1950-2000 sejarah kebangkitan dan masa depan. Kuala Lumpur: GG Edar.
Ismail, K. (1978). The Politics of Accommodation: An Analysis of the 1978 Malaysian General Election. Institute of Southeast Asian Studies.
Khong, K. H. (1991). Malaysia's General Election 1990: Continuity, Change, and Ethnic Politics. Institute of Southeast Asian Studies.
Sankaran, R., Mohd, H. A. (1988). Malaysia's 1986 General Election: The Urban-Rural Dichotomy. Institute of Southeast Asian Studies.
Surohanjaya Pilehanraya Malaysia. (1959). Penyata pilehanraya-pilehanraya umum parlimen (Dewan Ra'ayat) dan dewan-dewan negeri, tahun 1959 bagi negeri-negeri Tanah Melayu. Kuala Lumpur: Jabatan Chetak Kerajaan.
Surohanjaya Pilehanraya Malaysia. (1965). Penyata pilehanraya-pilehanraya umum parlimen (Dewan Ra'ayat) dan dewan-dewan negeri, tahun 1964 bagi negeri-negeri Tanah Melayu. Kuala Lumpur: Jabatan Chetak Kerajaan.
Surohanjaya Pilehanraya Malaysia. (1972). Penyata pilehanraya umum Dewan Raʻayat dan Dewan Undangan Negeri bagi Negeri² Tanah Melayu, Sabah dan Sarawak, tahun 1969. Kuala Lumpur: Jabatan Chetak Kerajaan.
Suruhanjaya Pilihanraya Malaysia. (1975). Penyata pilihanraya umum Dewan Rakyat dan Dewan Undangan Negeri bagi negeri-negeri Tanah Melayu dan Sarawak, tahun 1974. Kuala Lumpur: Jabatan Cetak Kerajaan.
Suruhanjaya Pilihanraya Malaysia. (1980). Penyata pilihanraya umum Dewan Rakyat dan dewan-dewan undangan Negeri kecuali dewan-dewan undangan negeri Kelantan, Sabah dan Sarawak, 1978. Kuala Lumpur: Jabatan Percetakan Negara.
Suruhanjaya Pilihanraya Malaysia. (1981). Penyata pilihanraya umum Dewan Undangan Negeri Kelantan 1978. Kuala Lumpur: Jabatan Percetakan Negara.
Vasil, R. K. (1972). The Malaysian general election of 1969. Singapore: Oxford University Press.
Zakry, A. (1990). Analisis pilihanraya umum, 1990. Kuala Lumpur: Penerbitan Myz.
 
 
 

Malaysia Legislative Assembly